The Metzger House is a historic residence in Mobile, Alabama, United States. The one-story Italianate-influenced brick structure was built by the Metzger family in 1875. It was added to the National Register of Historic Places on January 5, 1984, due to its architectural significance.

References

National Register of Historic Places in Mobile, Alabama
Houses on the National Register of Historic Places in Alabama
Houses in Mobile, Alabama
Houses completed in 1875
Italianate architecture in Alabama